The Case of Doctor Laurent (French: Le cas du Docteur Laurent) is a 1957 French drama film directed by Jean-Paul Le Chanois and starring Jean Gabin, Nicole Courcel and Silvia Monfort.

It was made at the Photosonor Studios in Courbevoie on the outskirts of Paris with location shooting taking place around Saint-Martin-Vésubie and Venanson in the French Alps. The film's sets were designed by the art director Serge Piménoff.

Cast
 Jean Gabin as Le docteur J. Laurent
 Nicole Courcel as Francine
 Silvia Monfort as Catherine Loubet
 Henri Arius as Le docteur A. Bastid 
 Daxely as M. Simonet, le boulanger
 Lucien Callamand as M. Bertrand - le directeur de l'école
 Josselin as M. Roux
 Mag-Avril as Céline 
 Marthe Marty as La mère de Franchine
 Germaine de France as Mme Vanolli
 Raymone as La mère Loubet
 Orane Demazis as La veuve Escalin
 Yvonne Gamy as La sage-femme traditionnaliste
 Henri-Jacques Huet as Antonin Escallin 
 Viviane Méry as Une habitante
 Riri Berty as Mme Simonet, la boulangère 
 Paul Bonifas as Guillaumin
 Jean Panisse as L'homme au poulain 
 Antoine Balpêtré as Docteur René Vanolli 
 Roger Karl as Docteur Guillot
 Robert Moor as Un docteur
 Michel Barbey as André Loubet
 Georges Lannes as Docteur Ripert

References

Bibliography 
 Harriss, Joseph. Jean Gabin: The Actor Who Was France. McFarland, 2018.

External links 
 

1957 films
1957 drama films
French drama films
1950s French-language films
Films directed by Jean-Paul Le Chanois
Films scored by Joseph Kosma
Films with screenplays by René Barjavel
1950s French films